The California Citizens Redistricting Commission is the redistricting commission for the State of California responsible for determining the boundaries of districts for the State Senate, State Assembly, and Board of Equalization. The commission was created in 2010 and consists of 14 members: five Democrats, five Republicans, and four from neither major party. The commission was created following the passage in November 2008 of California Proposition 11, the Voters First Act. The commissioners were selected in November and December 2010 and were required to complete the new maps by August 15, 2011.

Following the 2010 passage of California Proposition 20, the Voters First Act for Congress, the commission was also assigned the responsibility of redrawing the state's U.S. congressional district boundaries following the congressional apportionment arising from the 2010 United States Census.

The commission has been criticized by some politicians because "many safe seats in the Legislature could suddenly become competitive."

Results
The Commission certified new electoral district maps by the August 15, 2011 deadline. Maps for the state legislative districts passed with a 13–1 vote, and for Congressional districts with a 12–2 vote.

In response to a series of legal challenges, the California Supreme Court ruled unanimously three times in favor of the commission's maps, finding them in compliance with the U.S. Constitution and California Constitution. In addition, the U.S. Department of Justice granted pre-clearance of the commission's maps under Section 5 of the federal Voting Rights Act. The new districts took effect for the June 5, 2012 primary. Republican sponsors put a referendum on the Senate map on the November 6, 2012 ballot as Proposition 40, but have since reversed their position and are no longer opposing the new districts.

While the long-term results will bear out over time, independent studies by the Public Policy Institute of California, the National Journal, and Ballotpedia have shown that California now has some of the most competitive districts in the nation, creating opportunities for new elected officials.  For example, the uncertainty caused by the new districts combined with California's "top two" primary system has resulted in half a dozen resignations of incumbent Congressional representatives on both sides of the aisle, a major shake-up of California's Capitol Hill delegation. In addition, it has forced a number of intra-party races, most notably a showdown between two of the state's most powerful House Democrats, Representatives Howard Berman and Brad Sherman. In the previous 10 years, incumbents were so safe that only one Congressional seat changed party control in 255 elections, due to bipartisan gerrymandering after the redistricting following the 2000 Census. It is predicted that some of the newly elected politicians will be particularly well-suited for national politics since they will be forced to find positions that please moderate and independent voters to remain in office.

Commission selection process
In November 2008, California voters passed Proposition 11, authorizing a state redistricting commission. The California State Auditor (CSA) adopted regulations on 20 October 2009. The Applicant Review Panel was randomly selected on 16 November 2009. The initial application period to apply to be on the commission began on 15 December 2009 and continued through 16 February 2010. The CSA issued more regulations in 2010 dealing with how the first 8 commissioners would select the remaining 6. The required supplemental application period began on 17 February 2010 and continued through 19 April 2010. California Proposition 20 was passed in November 2010.

The California State Auditor collected nearly 5,000 completed applications out of over 30,000 for the commission. A three-member panel of auditors reviewed the applications and conducted interviews to establish a pool of 20 Democrats, 20 Republicans, and 20 applicants from neither major party. The panel submitted the list of 60 of the most qualified applicants to the Legislature on September 29, 2010.

The Speaker of the California State Assembly, the President Pro Tempore of the California State Senate, and the minority party leaders in the Assembly and the Senate, as authorized by the law, jointly reduced the pools to 12 members in each pool. The Legislature submitted a list of applicants remaining in the pool on 12 November 2010. The State Auditor then randomly drew three Democrats, three Republicans, and two applicants from neither major party to become commissioners on 18 November 2010. Finally, these first eight commissioners selected six commissioners from the remaining applicants in the pools on 15 December 2010.

Map-drawing process
The Voters First Act and Voters First Act for Congress amended Article XXI section 2(d) of the California Constitution to establish a set of rank-ordered criteria that the Commission followed to create new districts:	
 Population Equality: Districts must comply with the U.S. Constitution's requirement of “one person, one vote”
 Federal Voting Rights Act: Districts must ensure an equal opportunity for minorities to elect a candidate of their choice
 Geographic Contiguity:  All areas within a district must be connected to each other, except for the special case of islands
 Geographic Integrity: Districts shall minimize the division of cities, counties, local neighborhoods and communities of interests to the extent possible, without violating previous criteria. A community of interest is a contiguous population which shares common social and economic interests that should be included within a single district for purposes of its effective and fair representation. 
 Geographic Compactness: To the extent practicable, and where this does not conflict with previous criteria, districts must not bypass nearby communities for more distant communities
 Nesting: To the extent practicable, and where this does not conflict with previous criteria, each Senate district will be composed of two whole Assembly districts, Board of Equalization districts will be composed of 10 Senate districts.
In addition, incumbents, political candidates or political parties cannot be considered when drawing districts. Article XXI section 2(b) of the California Constitution also requires that the Commission "conduct an open and transparent process enabling full public consideration of and comment on the drawing of district lines." As documented in its final report, the Commission engaged in an extensive public input process that included 34 hearings across the state where 2700 citizens and a diverse range of organized groups gave public testimony, including organizations such as the League of Women Voters, California Forward, Common Cause, the California Chamber of Commerce (CalChamber), Equality California, Mexican American Legal Defense and Educational Fund (MALDEF), the Asian Pacific American Legal Center, the National Association for the Advancement of Colored People (NAACP), the Silicon Valley Leadership Group, and the Sierra Club. Over 20,000 written public comments were submitted through the wedrawthelines.ca.gov website, via email or fax.

Since the process was open, partisans were among those who attempted to influence the commission during the public hearing process to ensure the resulting districts were drawn in their favor. In a much-cited article, the investigative journalism publisher ProPublica found evidence that the California Democratic Party leaders coordinated with community groups to testify in front of the commission, and concluded that these efforts had manipulated the process. While the California Republican Party was quick to call for an investigation, other political observers were less surprised and noted that similar Republican efforts during the hearing process were simply less effective. In a response to the story, the Commission stated that it "had its eyes wide open" and that "the Commissioners were not unduly influenced by that."

Membership
Daniel Claypool was the commission's executive director. The commissioners are:

Restrictions on members

A commission member is ineligible for 10 years, beginning from the date of appointment, to hold elective public office at the federal, state, county, or city level in the State. A member is also ineligible for five years, beginning from the date of appointment, to hold appointive federal, state, or local public office, to serve as paid staff for, or as a paid consultant to, the Board of Equalization, the Congress, the Legislature, or any individual legislator, or to register as a federal, state or local lobbyist in the State.

Constitutionality

Opponents alleged California Proposition 20 had unconstitutionally transferred the power to draw congressional district lines from the California State Legislature to the redistricting commission. They argued the federal constitution prohibited the people from bypassing the state legislature and using ballot initiatives to make laws governing federal elections. The federal constitution provides, "The Times, Places and Manner of holding Elections for Senators and Representatives, shall be prescribed in each State by the Legislature thereof." (emphasis added).

On June 29, 2015, the U.S. Supreme Court upheld the constitutionality of an Arizona ballot initiative giving redistricting power to the Arizona Independent Redistricting Commission. Because the California and Arizona commissions were created in the same way and they had similar powers under state laws, it is widely understood that the ruling in the Arizona case has also implicitly upheld California Proposition 20 and the California Citizens Redistricting Commission.

See also
 Redistricting in California

References

External links

 Commission website

Politics of California
Redistricting commissions
California legislative districts